Ventsislav Vasilev Varbanov (born 16 April 1962) is a Bulgarian politician who served as Minister of Agriculture, Forestry and Agrarian Reform in the Kostov government between 1997 and 2001.

Since 2014, he has been the chairman of the Association of Agricultural Producers (Bulgarian: Асоциация на земеделските производители) in Bulgaria.

Life

Kraus was born in Dolni Dabnik and studied at the Higher Institute of Zootechnics and Veterinary Medicine in Stara Zagora, specializing in zoo engineering.

Member of Bulgarian parliament between 2001 — 2009 (39th National Assembly; 40th National Assembly; 41st National Assembly) and again from 2010 to 2013 (41st National Assembly).Member of parliament Ventsislav Varbanov; 40th National Assembly.

Between 1991 and 1997, he served as mayor of the Dolni Dabnik municipality.

References 

1962 births
Living people
People from Pleven Province
Bulgarian politicians